Minuscule 724 (in the Gregory-Aland numbering), ε530 (von Soden), is a Greek minuscule manuscript of the New Testament written on parchment and partially on paper. It is dated by a Colophon to 1520 CE. The manuscript has complex contents. Scrivener labelled it as 829e.

Description 

The codex contains the text of the four Gospels on 203 parchment and paper leaves (size ).

The text is written in single columns per page, 22 lines per page.

Text 

The Greek text of the codex is a representative of the Byzantine text-type. Aland placed it in Category V.

It was not examined by using Claremont Profile Method.

History 

Gregory dated the manuscript to the 15th century. The manuscript is currently dated by the INTF to the year 1520.

It was added to the list of New Testament manuscripts by Scrivener (829) and Gregory (724). Gregory saw the manuscript in 1887.

The manuscript is now housed at the Austrian National Library (Suppl. gr. 175) in Vienna.

See also 

 List of New Testament minuscules
 Biblical manuscript
 Textual criticism

References

Further reading 

 

Greek New Testament minuscules
15th-century biblical manuscripts
Biblical manuscripts of the Austrian National Library